Shama Parveen Magsi, (born March 15, 1950) is a politician from Balochistan, Pakistan.

Life

Magsi was elected to Provincial Assembly of Balochistan and was appointed as Minister of Information Technology, Provincial Coordination on NGOs Program (National / International) and Universities. Shama Parveen Magsi is married to Nawab Zulfikar Ali Magsi former Chief Minister of Balochistan. Prince Abdul Karim Khan was her father. She earned her BA degree (recently declared bogus and fake by the university (Dawn News)).

See also 
 Nawab Zulfikar Ali Magsi

References

External links 
 Profile of Shama Parveen Magsi

Living people
Baloch people
Women members of the Provincial Assembly of Balochistan
Pakistan Muslim League (Q) politicians
Shama Parveen
1950 births